Three-time defending champion Rafael Nadal defeated Roger Federer in the final, 6–1, 6–3, 6–0 to win the men's singles tennis title at the 2008 French Open. It was his fourth French Open title and his fourth major title overall. This marked Federer's worst loss at a major in his entire career. It also marked the third consecutive year that Nadal defeated Federer in the French Open final, and the fourth consecutive year that Nadal defeated Federer at Roland Garros (extending back to their 2005 semifinal encounter). On all four occasions that Nadal won the French Open, he defeated Federer while the latter was the world No. 1 player. Nadal won the title without losing a set, becoming the third man in the Open Era after Ilie Năstase and Björn Borg to do so. He would later replicate this feat in 2010, 2017, and 2020. Federer was attempting to complete the career Grand Slam; he would achieve the feat the following year.

This tournament marked the final professional appearance of former world No. 1 and three-time French Open champion Gustavo Kuerten; he lost to Paul-Henri Mathieu in the first round. It was also the last major for 2004 French Open finalist and former world No. 3 Guillermo Coria, who lost in the first round to Tommy Robredo.

Seeds

Click on the seed number of a player to go to their draw section.

Qualifying draw

Draw

Finals

Top half

Section 1

Section 2

Section 3

Section 4

Bottom half

Section 5

Section 6

Section 7

Section 8

References

External links
Official Roland Garros 2008 Men's Singles Draw
Main Draw
Qualifying Draw
2008 French Open – Men's draws and results at the International Tennis Federation

Men's Singles
French Open by year – Men's singles
French Open - Men's Singles